Tickalara Station most commonly known as Tickalara is a pastoral lease that operates as a cattle station in south west Queensland.

The Fitzgerald brothers owned the station from 1887 to 1897 and lost about £100,000 over those 10 years.

History
Tickalara received  of rain over a few days in 1890 and the surrounding country was submerged for miles around.
The property was stocked with about 50,000 sheep in 1894.

Sackville and Sidney Kidman acquired Tickalara in late 1897 for £10,000 from the Fitzgerald brothers. The Kidmans also acquired many other stations in the channel country at about the same time including Annandale and Alton Downs Station.

Following a drought in Western Australia and South Australia in 1914, Kidman offered farmers agistment for their horses at Tickalara for 500 head until conditions improved.

See also
List of ranches and stations

References

Stations (Australian agriculture)
Pastoral leases in Queensland